The 2019-20 Minnesota Duluth Bulldogs men's ice hockey season was the 76th season of play for the program and the 7th in the NCHC conference. The Bulldogs represented the University of Minnesota Duluth and were coached by Scott Sandelin, in his 20th season.

On March 12, 2020, NCHC announced that the tournament was cancelled due to the coronavirus pandemic, before any games were played.

Roster
As of September 8, 2019.

Standings

Schedule and Results

|-
!colspan=12 style=";" | Exhibition

|-
!colspan=12 style=";" | Regular Season

|-
!colspan=12 style=";" | 
|- align="center" bgcolor="#e0e0e0"
|colspan=12|Tournament Cancelled

Scoring Statistics

Goaltending statistics

Rankings

Players drafted into the NHL

2020 NHL Entry Draft

† incoming freshman

References

Minnesota Duluth Bulldogs men's ice hockey seasons
Minnesota Duluth Bulldogs 
Minnesota Duluth Bulldogs 
Minnesota Duluth Bulldogs 
Minnesota Duluth Bulldogs